Combes is a town in northern Cameron County, Texas, United States. Its population was 2,895 at the 2010 census. It is part of the Brownsville–Harlingen–Raymondville and the Matamoros–Brownsville metropolitan areas.

Geography

Combes is located in northwestern Cameron County at  (26.245051, –97.727028). U.S. Route 77/Interstate 69E passes through the town, leading south  to Harlingen and north  to Raymondville. It is the last town U.S. 77 and Interstate 69E pass through in Cameron County going northward before entering Willacy County at Sebastian, about 8 miles to the north. Combes is home to the eastern terminus of Texas State Highway 107, which leads about 6 miles (10 km) west to Santa Rosa, and eventually to Edinburg, 29 miles ( 47 km ) to the west.

Demographics

2020 census

As of the 2020 United States census, there were 2,999 people, 1,038 households, and 683 families residing in the town.

2000 census
As of the census of 2000,  2,553 people, 775 households, and 626 were families residing in the town. The population density was 1,034.6 people per square mile (399.1/km2). The 1,039 housing units averaged of 421.0 per square mile (162.4/km2). The racial makeup of the town was 80.38% White, 0.35% African American, 1.29% Native American, 0.27% Asian, 0.31% Pacific Islander, 15.08% from other races, and 2.31% from two or more races. Hispanics or Latinos of any race were 76.30% of the population.

Of the 775 households, 41.8% had children under the age of 18 living with them, 65.8% were married couples living together, 11.5% had a female householder with no husband present, and 19.1% were not families. About 16.6% of all households were made up of individuals, and 9.3% had someone living alone who was 65 years of age or older. The average household size was 3.29, and the average family size was 3.76.

In the town, the age distribution was  33.8% under 18, 8.9% from 18 to 24, 25.6% from 25 to 44, 18.3% from 45 to 64, and 13.4% who were 65 or older. The median age was 31 years. For every 100 females, there were 94.9 males. For every 100 females age 18 and over, there were 91.1 males.

The median income for a household in the town was $28,605, and for a family was $31,190. Males had a median income of $22,332 versus $17,159 for females. The per capita income for the town was $9,546. About 18.9% of families and 22.1% of the population were below the poverty line, including 27.7% of those under age 18 and 14.4% of those age 65 or over.

Education
Combes is served by the Harlingen Consolidated Independent School District.

In addition, South Texas Independent School District operates magnet schools that serve the community.

Government and infrastructure
The United States Postal Service operates the Combes Post Office.

References

Towns in Cameron County, Texas
Towns in Texas